Synthesis/Regeneration was an independently published quarterly magazine whose articles examined contemporary issues in environmental politics, energy development, energy policy, climate change, social change, and social justice.

Synthesis/Regeneration was the editorial confluence of two earlier magazines, Green Synthesis and Regeneration.

References

1993 establishments in Missouri
2013 disestablishments in Missouri
Alternative magazines
Defunct political magazines published in the United States
Environmental magazines
Magazines established in 1993
Magazines disestablished in 2013
Magazines published in St. Louis
Quarterly magazines published in the United States